"I Like Control" is a song by DJ Clue? featuring Missy Elliott and her former protégées Nicole Wray and Mocha. The song was released via radio airplay on February 13, 1999 as the second single from Clue's solo debut studio album, The Professional (1998). The song charted on Billboard Hot R&B/Hip-Hop Songs based solely on airplay, where it debuted in its peak position of #81.

Chart performance

References

1998 songs
1999 singles
Missy Elliott songs
Songs written by Missy Elliott
Songs written by El DeBarge
Roc-A-Fella Records singles